This is a list of diplomatic missions in the People's Republic of China, excluding Hong Kong and Macau. Due to the One-China policy, the PRC is recognized by 178 out of 193 United Nations member states and the State of Palestine as its sovereignty is disputed by the Republic of China. As the world's most populous country, the world's largest economy by PPP, and a major great power, as well as an emerging superpower, China is a permanent member of the United Nations Security Council, with a recognized nuclear power state and the world's largest standing army. In 2019, China had the largest diplomatic network in the world. China hosts a large diplomatic community in its capital city of Beijing. Beijing hosts 173 embassies, with numerous countries maintaining consulates general and consulates throughout the country.

Embassies in Beijing

Embassies to open

Other Delegations/Missions to China in Beijing 
  (Mission)
  (Mission)
  (Delegation)
  (Representative Office)
  (Office of Commercial Development)
  (Representative Office)
  (United Nations Resident Coordinator's Office)
  (United Nations Development Programme)

Consulates General/Consulates

Changsha

Chengdu

Chongqing

Dalian
 (Branch Office of Consulate General in Shenyang)
 (Consular Office of Consulate General in Shenyang)

Dandong
 (Consular Office of Consulate General in Shenyang)

Erenhot
 (Consulate)

Guangzhou

Haikou

Harbin

Hohhot

Hong Kong

Manzhouli 
 (Consulate)

Jinan

Jinghong
 (Consular Office of Consulate General in Kunming)

Kunming

Lhasa

Macau

Nanning

Qingdao

Shanghai

 
 

 

 

 

 

 
 

 

 

 

 

 

 (Consulate)

Shenyang

Urumqi

 (Representative Office)
 (Representative Office)

Wuhan

Xiamen

Xi'an

Non-resident embassies 
(Andorra la Vella)
(Saint John's)
(Monaco)
(Jakarta)

Non-resident missions 
 (Seoul)

Countries without formal diplomatic missions to China

States with relations

States with no relations AKA Recognized Republic of China
 since 1989

 since 1998
 since 2005

 since 2007

States with no relations with the two Chinas

States with limited or no recognition with no relations with the PRC

Closed missions

See also 

 Foreign relations of the People's Republic of China
 List of diplomatic missions of the People's Republic of China
 Visa requirements for Chinese citizens

References

Citations

Sources 

 Beijing Diplomatic List
 https://www.embassy-worldwide.com/country/china/

 
Foreign relations of China
China
China diplomacy-related lists